Nettle Creek Township (T34N R6E) is one of seventeen townships in Grundy County, Illinois, USA.  As of the 2010 census, its population was 503 and it contained 187 housing units.

Geography

Unincorporated towns
 Nettle Creek at 
(This list is based on USGS data and may include former settlements.)

Cemeteries
The township contains Holderman and Hoge Cemetery.

Major highways
  Interstate 80
  U.S. Route 6

Demographics

Political districts
 Illinois' 11th congressional district
 State House District 75
 State Senate District 38

References
Sources
 
 United States Census Bureau 2007 TIGER/Line Shapefiles
 United States National Atlas
Notes

External links
 City-Data.com
 Illinois State Archives

Townships in Grundy County, Illinois
1849 establishments in Illinois
Townships in Illinois
Populated places established in 1849